Hanam is a city in Gyeonggi Province, South Korea.

It could also refer to:
 Hanam Jungwon
 Hanam-dong